Pustular bacterid is a skin condition characterized by a symmetric, grouped, vesicular or pustular eruption on the palms and soles marked by exacerbations and remissions over long periods of time.

See also 
 List of cutaneous conditions

References

External links 

 

Recalcitrant palmoplantar eruptions